Jefferson's Garden is a 2015 play by Timberlake Wertenbaker. It premiered at the Watford Palace Theatre from 5 to 21 February 2015, with Jefferson played by William Hope. It begins in the 1750s, but is centred on the period from 1776 to the early 1790s, covering the American Revolutionary War and its aftermath. It is named after Thomas Jefferson's gardens at Monticello and contrasts his part in writing the American Declaration of Independence with the continuation of slavery in the American colonies and on Jefferson's lands after independence.

See also
 List of plays and musicals about the American Revolution
 Thomas Jefferson on slavery

External links 
Peter Aspden, "Timberlate Wertenbaker on 'Jefferson's Garden'", Financial Times, 30 January 2015
http://www.watfordpalacetheatre.co.uk/page/jeffersons-garden#-About
Michael Billington, "Jefferson’s Garden review – Timberlake Wertenbaker’s American tragedy", The Guardian, 10 February 2015
Mark Lawson, "Timberlake Wertenbaker: ‘You can’t get a straightforward history of America’" The Guardian, 7 February 2015.

Plays based on real people
British plays
Plays set in the United States
2015 plays
Cultural depictions of Thomas Jefferson
Plays about the American Revolution
Works about American slavery
Plays about slavery
Plays about war
Plays set in the 18th century